is a Japanese author.

His most famous work, Hare Tokidoki Buta, known in English as Fair, then Partly Piggy, was later written as an anime series (titled Tokyo Pig in English) by Shinichi Watanabe.

Works
Yadama's works were translated into English by Keith Holeman.
 Fair, then Partly Piggy   (はれときどきぶた Hare Tokidoki Buta)
 Tomorrow is Pig Day! and Pig Time!  (あしたぶたの日ぶたじかん Ashita Buta no Hi Buta Jikan)
 Sometimes I'm a Pig  (ぼくときどきぶた Boku Tokidoki Buta)

The following have not been translated:
 Hare Tokidoki Tako (はれときどきたこ)
 Boku Heso Made Manga (ぼくへそまでまんが)
 Yume Kara Yumenbo (ゆめからゆめんぼ)
 Hikkosu de Hikkosu (ヒッコスでひっこす)

External links
 Yadama's website 
 Shiro Yadama at J'Lit Books from Japan 

Japanese writers
Living people
1944 births